The Vinje Power Station  (Vinje kraftverk) is a hydroelectric power station located near the lake Vinjevatn in the municipality Vinje in Vestfold og Telemark, Norway.

See also

References 

Hydroelectric power stations in Norway
Buildings and structures in Vestfold og Telemark
Dams in Norway
Vinje